The 1937 Farnham by-election was held on 23 March 1937.  The by-election was held due to the elevation to the peerage of the incumbent Conservative MP, Arthur Samuel.  It was won by the Conservative candidate Godfrey Nicholson.

Peter Pain, a recently qualified barrister, contested the election for the Labour Party.  Earlier in the decade, he had visited a Hitler Youth camp, and this experience convinced him that a war was inevitable, and that he should oppose Nazism by becoming a socialist.

Linton Thorp, who contested the election as an independent conservative, was a former Conservative MP who had left the party believing that some of its policies were too close to socialism.  He stood with the support of the pro-Nazi Liberty Restoration League.

The election was won by the Conservative candidate Godfrey Nicholson.

References

1937 elections in the United Kingdom
1937 in England
20th century in Surrey
Farnham
By-elections to the Parliament of the United Kingdom in Surrey constituencies